Orbitestella is a genus of sea snails, marine gastropod mollusks in the family Orbitestellidae.

Species
 Orbitestella aequicostata Raines, 2002
 Orbitestella bastowi (Gatliff, 1906)
 Orbitestella bermudezi (Aguayo & Borro, 1946)
 Orbitestella cordarta Rubio & Rolán, 2021
 Orbitestella cubana Rolán & Rubio, 1992
 Orbitestella dariae (Liuzzi & Zucchi Stolfa, 1979)
 Orbitestella decorata Laseron, 1954
 Orbitestella diegensis (Bartsch, 1907)
 † Orbitestella dioi Hybertsen & Kiel, 2018 
 Orbitestella ellenstrongae Rubio & Rolán, 2021
 Orbitestella fijiensis Rubio & Rolán, 2021
 Orbitestella furtiva Rolán, Rubio & Letourneux, 2020
 Orbitestella gemmulata (W. H. Turton, 1932)
 † Orbitestella granulata Lozouet, 1998 
 Orbitestella hinemoa Mestayer, 1919
 Orbitestella marquesensis Rubio & Rolán, 2021
 Orbitestella media Rubio & Rolán, 2021
 Orbitestella nova Rolán, Rubio & Letourneux, 2020
 Orbitestella pacifica Rubio & Rolán, 2021
 † Orbitestella palaiopacifica Squires & Goedert, 1996 
 Orbitestella papuaensis Rubio & Rolán, 2021
 Orbitestella parva (Finlay, 1924)
 Orbitestella patagonica Simone & Zelaya, 2004
 Orbitestella peculiaris Rubio & Rolán, 2021
 Orbitestella perlata (Pelseneer, 1903)
 † Orbitestella planibasis (Gougerot & Le Renard, 1978) 
 † Orbitestella plicatella (Cossmann, 1888) 
 † Orbitestella ponderi Linse, 2002
 † Orbitestella praehinemoa Laws, 1939 
 Orbitestella praetoreuma Laws, 1939 
 Orbitestella pruinosa Ortega & Gofas, 2019
 Orbitestella radiata Rolán, Rubio & Letourneux, 2020
 Orbitestella regina Kay, 1979
 Orbitestella sarsi (Bush, 1897)
 Orbitestella similis Rolán & Rubio, 1992
 Orbitestella toreuma Powell, 1930
 Orbitestella vanuatuensis Rubio & Rolán, 2021
 Orbitestella wareni Ponder, 1990
Species brought into synonymy
 Orbitestella mayii (Tate, 1899): synonym of Microcarina mayii (Tate, 1899)
 Orbitestella vera Powell, 1940: synonym of Orbitestella parva (Finlay, 1924)

References

 Magne A. & Vergneau-Saubade A.M. (1973). Le gisement stampien de Bruges (Gironde). Mollusques. Bulletin de l'Institut Géologique du Bassin d'Aquitaine. 14: 111-116.
 Ponder, W. F. (1967). The classification of the Rissoidae and Orbitestellidae with descriptions of some new taxa. Transactions of the Royal Society of New Zealand, Zoology. 9(17): 193-224, pls 1-13.
 Ponder, W.F. (1990). The anatomy and relationships of the Orbitestellidae (Gastropoda: Heterobranchia). Journal of Molluscan Studies. 56: 515-532

External links

 Iredale, T. (1917). Molluscan name-changes, generic and specific. Proceedings of the Malacological Society of London. 12(6): 322-330
 Ortega, J.; Gofas, S. (2019). The unknown bathyal of the Canaries: new species and new records of deep-sea Mollusca. Zoosystema.41(26): 513-551.

Orbitestellidae